Olga Belmar (born 22 September 1946) is a Mexican former swimmer. She competed in the women's 400 metre freestyle at the 1964 Summer Olympics.

References

1946 births
Living people
Mexican female swimmers
Olympic swimmers of Mexico
Swimmers at the 1964 Summer Olympics
Place of birth missing (living people)
20th-century Mexican women